Blagg is a tiny lunar impact crater located on the Sinus Medii. It is a circular crater with no appreciable erosion. To the east-southeast is the irregular crater Rhaeticus, and northeast lies Triesnecker.  It is about 33 km to the east of the slightly larger Bruce. It was named after noted English astronomer Mary Adela Blagg. Its diameter is 5.0 km.

References

External links

Blagg at The Moon Wiki

Impact craters on the Moon